The 1856 New South Wales colonial election was to return 54 members of Legislative Assembly composed of 34 electoral districts with 18 returning 1 member, 13 returning 2 members, two returning 3 members and one returning 4 members,  all with a first past the post system. In multi-member districts, because each voter could cast more than one vote, it is not possible to total the votes to show the number of voters and voter turnout in these districts is estimated. 8 members from 6 districts were returned unopposed.

Results by district

Argyle

Polling was conducted on 31 March 1856. Plunkett served in the old Legislative Council as an appointed member. After failed attempts to win election for Sydney City and North Eastern Boroughs, Plunkett was elected to represent Bathurst (County) on the same day as winning Argyle. After attending the first sitting of Parliament representing both seats, and even attempting to use both votes in the ballot for Speaker, Plunkett resigned as MP for Bathurst (County) and represented Argyle. Sitting Legislative Councillor for County of Argyle was Charles Nicholson who did not contest the election.

Bathurst (County)

Polling was conducted on 31 March 1856. Both Bligh and Plunkett had served in the old Legislative Council, Bligh representing County of Bathurst and Plunkett as an appointed member. After failed attempts to win election for Sydney City and North Eastern Boroughs, Plunkett was elected to represent Argyle on the same day as winning Bathurst (County). After signing the attendance book at the first sitting as a representative of both seats, and even attempting to vote twice in the ballot for Speaker, he chose to represent Argyle and resigned as member for Bathurst (County).

Clarence and Darling Downs

Polling was conducted on 15 April 1856. Sitting Legislative Councillor for Pastoral Districts of Clarence and Darling Downs was Thomas Hood who did not contest the election but was appointed to the new Legislative Council.

Cook and Westmoreland

Polling was conducted on 4 April 1856. Martin represented Counties of Cook and Westmoreland in the old Legislative Council.

Cumberland Boroughs

Polling was conducted on 8 April 1856. Bowman represented this seat in the old Legislative Council.

Cumberland (North Riding)

Polling was conducted on 4 April 1856. Both Darvall and Fitzgerald represented the County of Cumberland in the old Legislative Council.

Cumberland (South Riding)

Polling was conducted on 9 April 1856. Manning had served in the old Legislative Council as an appointed member. Unlike other newly appointed Ministers, he did not have to resign and contest a ministerial by-election as he already held the office of Solicitor-General at the time of his election. Weekes was elected, but later won an appeal against his defeat in Northumberland Boroughs, choosing to sit for that seat and resign from this seat. The subsequent by-election was won by Brenan.

Durham

Polling was conducted on 7 April 1856. Park had represented County of Durham in the old Legislative Council, while another representative in Charles Cowper contested Sydney City.

Eastern Division of Camden

Polling was conducted on 31 March 1856. Osborne had represented this district in the old Legislative Council.

Gloucester and Macquarie

Polling was conducted on 10 April 1856. Barker served in the old Legislative Council as an appointed member. Sitting Legislative Councillor for Counties of Gloucester and Macquarie was Phillip Parker King who did not contest the election.

King and Georgiana

Polling was conducted on 7 April 1856. James Chisholm, the member of the Legislative Council for Counties of King and Georgiana, did not contest the election.

Lachlan and Lower Darling

Polling was conducted on 19 April 1856. Macleay had represented Pastoral Districts of Lachlan and Lower Darling in the old Legislative Council.

Liverpool Plains and Gwydir

Polling was conducted on 16 April 1856. Morris had represented Pastoral Districts of Liverpool Plains and Gwydir in the old Legislative Council.

Maneroo

Polling was scheduled to be conducted on 16 April 1856. Egan had represented Pastoral District of Maneroo in the old Legislative Council.

Moreton, Wide Bay, Burnett and Maranoa

Polling was scheduled to be conducted on 17 April 1856. Sitting Legislative Councillor for Pastoral Districts of Moreton, Wide Bay, Burnett, and Maranoa was Richard Joseph Smith who did not contest the election.

Murrumbidgee

Polling was scheduled to be conducted on 16 April 1856. Macleay represented Pastoral District of Murrumbidgee in the old Legislative Council.

New England and Macleay

Polling was conducted on 17 April 1856. Rusden had represented Pastoral Districts of New England and Macleay in the old Legislative Council.

North Eastern Boroughs

Polling was conducted on 29 March 1856. Both Flood and Plunkett had served in the old Legislative Council, Flood representing this district and Plunkett as an appointed member. Plunkett had earlier contested Sydney City and was unsuccessful. After his defeat in this seat, Plunkett contested both Argyle and Bathurst (County).

Northumberland and Hunter

Polling was conducted on 17 April 1856. Both Bowman and Douglass had represented Counties of Northumberland and Hunter in the old Legislative Council. John Plunkett was nominated to stand in this seat but after being elected to both Argyle and Bathurst (County) on 31 March, he withdrew his nomination.

Northumberland Boroughs

Polling was conducted on 28 March 1856. Nichols represented this district in the old Legislative Council. Committee of Elections and Qualifications conducted a re-count and overturned the election of Bourn Russell and declared that Elias Weekes had been elected.

Parramatta

Polling was conducted on 29 March 1856. Both Parker and Oakes had served in the old Legislative Council, Oakes representing Town of Parramatta and Parker as an appointed member.

Phillip, Brisbane and Bligh

Polling was conducted on 11 April 1856. William Dumaresq, the sitting Legislative Councillor for Counties of Phillip, Brisbane and Bligh, did not contest the election.

Roxburgh

Polling was conducted on 8 April 1856. Suttor had served in the old Legislative Council as the elected member for Counties of Roxburgh, Phillip and Wellington from 1843 to 1851, then as the elected member for Counties of Roxburgh and Wellington from 1851 to 1854. The sitting Legislative Councillor, Saul Samuel contested Wellington (County).

St Vincent

Polling was conducted on 10 April 1856. Sitting Legislative Councillor for Counties of Murray and St Vincent, Daniel Cooper contested Sydney Hamlets.

Southern Boroughs

Polling was scheduled to be conducted on 4 April 1856. Murray had represented this district in the old Legislative Council.

Stanley Boroughs

Polling was conducted on 7 April 1856. Richardson had represented this district in the old Legislative Council.

Stanley County

Polling was conducted on 9 April 1856. Sitting Legislative Councillor for County of Stanley was John Dunmore Lang who did not contest the election.

Sydney City

Cowper, Parkes, Campbell and Wilshire had been endorsed as a group by a public meeting to be elected to the four vacancies. Parkes, Campbell and Wilshire all represented City of Sydney in the Legislative Council while Cowper represented County of Durham. There were no political parties at the time and the combination of candidates, pejoratively referred to by Plunkett as "The Bunch", was controversial. Plunket, who had been an appointed member of the Council, campaigned on the slogan "plump for Plunket", a reference to the voting practice of voting for a single candidate rather than the four candidates an elector was entitled to vote for.

After his defeat in this seat, Plunkett unsuccessfully contested North Eastern Boroughs, before being elected for both Argyle and Bathurst (County). Plunket chose to represent Argyle and resigned as member for Bathurst (County).

Sydney Hamlets

Polling was conducted on 11 March 1856. Both Donaldson and Cooper served in the old Legislative Council, Donaldson representing Sydney Hamlets and Cooper Murray and St Vincent.

United Counties of Murray and St Vincent

Polling was scheduled to be conducted on 5 April 1856. Sitting Legislative Councillor for Counties of Murray and St Vincent, Daniel Cooper contested Sydney Hamlets.

Wellington and Bligh

Polling was conducted on 16 April 1856. Sitting Legislative Councillor for this district Charles Wray Finch did not contest the election.

Wellington (County)

Polling was conducted on 10 April 1856. Samuel represented Counties of Roxburgh and Wellington in the old Legislative Council.

Western Boroughs

Polling was conducted on 29 March 1856. Holroyd had represented this district in the old Legislative Council.

Western Division of Camden

Polling was scheduled to be conducted on 31 March 1856. Macarthur had represented this district in the old Legislative Council.

See also
 Members of the New South Wales Legislative Assembly, 1856–1858
 Candidates of the 1856 New South Wales colonial election

References

1856